An akinete is an enveloped, thick-walled, non-motile, dormant cell formed by filamentous, heterocyst-forming cyanobacteria under the order Nostocales and Stigonematales. Akinetes are resistant to cold and desiccation. They also accumulate and store various essential material, both of which allows the akinete to serve as a survival structure for up to many years. However, akinetes are not resistant to heat.  Akinetes usually develop in strings with each cell differentiating after another and this occurs next to heterocysts if they are present. Development usually occurs during stationary phase and is triggered by unfavorable conditions such as insufficient light or nutrients, temperature, and saline levels in the environment. Once conditions become more favorable for growth, the akinete can then germinate back into a vegetative cell. Increased light intensity, nutrients availability, oxygen availability, and changes in salinity are important triggers for germination.
In comparison to vegetative cells, akinetes are generally larger. This is associated with the accumulation of nucleic acids which is important for both dormancy and germination of the akinete. Despite being a resting cell, it is still capable of some metabolic activities such as photosynthesis, protein synthesis, and carbon fixation, albeit at significantly lower levels.

Akinetes can remain dormant for extended periods of time. Studies have shown that some species could be cultured that were 18 and 64 years old. 

Akinete formation also influences the perennial blooms of cyanobacteria.

References 

Cell biology
Cyanobacterial cells